Andy Kelly (born 8 November 1960), also known by the nicknames of "Boot", and "Big Andy", is an English former professional rugby league footballer who played in the 1980s and 1990s, and coached in the 1990s, 2000s and 2010s.

Background
Andy Kelly was born in Wakefield, West Riding of Yorkshire, England.

Playing career

England International - 1984

RL Championship Winner - 1983/84 & 1984/85

Yorkshire Cup Winner - 1985/86

JPS Trophy R-Up - 1985/86

Premiership Trophy R-Up - 1984/85 

Yorkshire Cup R-Up - 1984/85

International honours
Andy Kelly won a cap for England while at Wakefield Trinity in 1984 against Wales.

Challenge Cup Final appearances
Andy Kelly played left-, i.e. number 11, in Hull Kingston Rovers' 14–15 defeat by Castleford in the 1985–86 Challenge Cup Final during the 1985–86 season at Wembley Stadium, London, on Saturday 3 May 1986, in front of a crowd of 82,134.

County Cup Final appearances
Andy Kelly played right-, i.e. number 12, in Hull Kingston Rovers' 12–29 defeat by Hull F.C. in the 1984–85 Yorkshire County Cup Final during the 1984–85 season at Boothferry Park, Kingston upon Hull, on Saturday 27 October 1984, played as an interchange/substitute, i.e. number 15, (replacing  Phil Hogan) in the 22–18 victory over Castleford in the 1985–86 Yorkshire County Cup Final during the 1985–86 season at Headingley Rugby Stadium, Leeds, on Sunday 27 October 1985. 

He played left-, i.e. number 11, and was captain in Wakefield Trinity's 8–11 defeat by Castleford in the 1990–91 Yorkshire County Cup Final during the 1990–91 season at Elland Road, Leeds, on Sunday 23 September 1990.

John Player Special Trophy Final appearances
Andy Kelly played right-, i.e. number 12, in Hull Kingston Rovers' 8–11 defeat by Wigan in the 1985–86 John Player Special Trophy Final during the 1985–86 season at Elland Road, Leeds on Saturday 11 January 1986.

Playing career
During his time at Wakefield Trinity he scored fifteen 3-point tries and, fifteen 4-point tries.

Coaching career
He is the former head coach of the Ireland national rugby league team having coached them for over 11 years. 

He is the former coach of Dewsbury Rams, Wakefield Trinity/Wakefield Trinity Wildcats, Featherstone Rovers and Gateshead.

He is currently head of youth at Huddersfield Giants and recently helped the Giants Academy team reach the grand final playoffs for the first time

Genealogical information
Andy Kelly is one of three brothers to have played professional Rugby league; Neil Kelly played for Wakefield Trinity, Dewsbury Rams, Hunslet and Featherstone Rovers and Richard Kelly played for Wakefield Trinity and Dewsbury Rams during the 1980s and 1990s.

References

External links
Kelly Leads Wakefield to Grand Final Glory
2010 Kelly Leaves Irish Post
2010 Kelly eyes Student Cup Shock
2010 Andy Kelly Joins Alex Murphy for Challenge Cup Draw (video)
2009 Wales 42 v Ireland 12 post match interviews (video)
2008 Kelly hopes for NEW OPPORTUNITIES After World Cup Success
2008 RLWC Fiji 40 v Ireland 14 post match interview (video)
2008 RLWC Samoa v Ireland Post match Interview (audio)
2008 Superb Ireland Hammer Samoa
2008 RLWC Samoa V Ireland Samoan war dance (video)
2008 Ireland Shake Tonga in World Cup Opener
2008 Kelly Names World Cup Squad
2007 Andy Kelly takes Ireland Team to Carnegie University (video)
2007 Kelly Proud to Lead Ireland
2004 Kelly handed Dewsbury post
2001 Same again for Ireland
2000 Kelly Leaves Job as Head Coach of Wakefield
Andy Kelly interview at wakefieldwildcats.co.uk
Great Britain Rugby All Stars Squad

1960 births
Living people
Dewsbury Rams coaches
England national rugby league team players
English rugby league coaches
English rugby league players
Featherstone Rovers coaches
Newcastle Thunder coaches
Hull Kingston Rovers players
Ireland national rugby league team coaches
Rugby league players from Wakefield
Rugby league second-rows
Wakefield Trinity coaches
Wakefield Trinity players